was a town located in Hidaka District, Wakayama Prefecture, Japan.

As of 2003, the town had an estimated population of 6,896 and a density of 90.77 persons per km². The total area was 75.97 km².

On May 1, 2005, Kawabe, along with the villages of Miyama and Nakatsu (all from Hidaka District), was merged to create the town of Hidakagawa.

External links
Kawabe official town website 
Hidakagawa official town website 

Dissolved municipalities of Wakayama Prefecture